"On Days Like These" is a pop ballad by English singer Matt Monro. It was composed by Quincy Jones, written by Don Black, and produced by George Martin. It was first released on Quincy Jones' soundtrack album The Italian Job by Paramount Records, as it was written for the 1969 film of the same name, where it is played prominently in the opening credits, uninterrupted by background soundscape.

Certifications

References

1969 songs
1969 singles
Matt Monro songs
Songs written by Quincy Jones
Songs with lyrics by Don Black (lyricist)
Song recordings produced by George Martin